The 10th National People's Congress was in session from 2003 to 2008. It held five plenary sessions in this period. There were 2,984 deputies to this Congress.  It succeeded the 9th National People's Congress.

The 1st Session

The Congress held its first plenary session from March 5–18, 2003 at the Great Hall of the People in Beijing.

Election results 
Elections to the Congress were held fron October 2002 to February 2003, the first including deputies representing Macau. These deputies elected the following:

|-
! style="background-color:#E9E9E9;text-align:left;vertical-align:top;" |Parties
!style="background-color:#E9E9E9"|Seats
|-
| style="text-align:left;" |
Communist Party of China (中国共产党)
Revolutionary Committee of the Kuomintang (民革)
China Democratic League (民盟)
China Democratic National Construction Association (民建)
China Association for Promoting Democracy (民进)
Chinese Peasants' and Workers' Democratic Party (农工民主党)
Zhigongdang of China (中国致公党)
Jiusan Society (九三学社)
Taiwan Democratic Self-Government League (台盟)
Non-partisans
| style="vertical-align:top;" |2,985
|-
|style="text-align:left;background-color:#E9E9E9"|Total
|width="30" style="text-align:right;background-color:#E9E9E9"|2,985
|}

The 2nd Session
The Congress held its second annual meeting from March 5–14, 2004 at the Great Hall of the People in Beijing.

The 3rd Session
The Congress held its third annual meeting from March 5–14, 2005 at the Great Hall of the People in Beijing.

The 4th Session

The Congress held its fourth annual meeting from March 5–15, 2006 at the Great Hall of the People in Beijing.

The 5th Session

The Congress held its fifth annual meeting from March 5 to March 15, 2007, at the Great Hall of the People in Beijing.

References

External links
  Official website of the NPC

National People's Congresses
2003 in China